Vijay Mahajan is the John P. Harbin Centennial Chair in Business at McCombs School of Business, University of Texas at Austin. He was born on April 5, 1948 in Jammu, India. He is known for his work on marketing strategy, international marketing and innovation. He was the dean of the Indian School of Business from 2002-2004 and is a former editor-in-chief of the Journal of Marketing Research.

Books
Mahajan, Vijay, and Kamini Banga. The 86 percent solution: How to succeed in the biggest market opportunity of the next 50 years. Pearson Education, 2005.
Vijay Mahajan. 2009. Africa Rising. Wharton School Publishing.
Vijay Mahajan. 2012. The Arab World Unbound: Tapping Into The Power of 350 Million Consumers. Wiley, Jossey, Bass.
Vijay Mahajan and Yoram Wind, eds. 1986. Innovation Diffusion Models of New Product Acceptance. Cambridge, MA: Ballinger Publishing Co.

Selected publications
Chitturi, Ravindra, Rajagopal Raghunathan, and Vijay Mahajan. "Delight by design: The role of hedonic versus utilitarian benefits." Journal of Marketing 72, no. 3 (2008): 48-63.
Burnham, Thomas A., Judy K. Frels, and Vijay Mahajan. "Consumer switching costs: a typology, antecedents, and consequences." Journal of the Academy of marketing Science 31, no. 2 (2003): 109-126.
Sarin, Shikhar, and Vijay Mahajan. "The effect of reward structures on the performance of cross-functional product development teams." Journal of marketing 65, no. 2 (2001): 35-53.
Mahajan, Vijay, Eitan Muller, and Rajendra K. Srivastava. "Determination of adopter categories by using innovation diffusion models." Journal of Marketing Research (1990): 37-50.
Mahajan, Vijay, Eitan Muller, and Frank M. Bass. "Diffusion of new products: Empirical generalizations and managerial uses." Marketing Science 14, no. 3_supplement (1995): G79-G88.
Bettis, Richard A., and Vijay Mahajan. "Risk/return performance of diversified firms." Management Science 31, no. 7 (1985): 785-799.

References

American business theorists
American business writers
American economics writers
Marketing people
Living people
1948 births
McCombs School of Business faculty
American academics of Indian descent
Indian scholars
Journal of Marketing Research editors